Kalynivka is an urban-type settlement in Brovary Raion (district) of Kyiv Oblast (province) in northern Ukraine. It hosts the administration of Kalynivka settlement hromada, one of the hromadas of Ukraine. Its population is 6,178 as of the 2001 Ukrainian Census. Kalynivka was founded in 1928 as a village, and it retained its village status until it was upgraded to that of an urban-type settlement on January 23, 2003. Population: .

References

External link

Brovary Raion
Urban-type settlements in Brovary Raion
Populated places established in 1928
Kyiv metropolitan area